Siriako Usa (born 21 August 1959) is a Solomon Islands politician. He is a member of the National Parliament of the Solomon Islands representing the North West Guadalcanal Constituency. He was first elected on 5 December 2001 and was re-elected on 5 April 2006. He served as Minister for Lands and Survey in the Kemakeza government (2001–06) and then as Minister for Mines and Minerals in the Sogavare government (2006–07).

References

Members of the National Parliament of the Solomon Islands
1959 births
Living people
People from Guadalcanal Province